This article details scores and results from the 2009 NRL Under-20s season.

Regular season
Times for Rounds 1 – 4 are Australian Eastern Daylight Saving Time. Times for Round 5 and the remainder of the season are Australian Eastern Standard Time.

Round 1

Round 2

Round 3

Round 4

Round 5

Round 6

Round 7

Round 8

Round 9

Round 10

Round 11

Round 12

Round 13

Round 14

Round 15

Round 16

Round 17

Round 18

Round 19

Round 20

Round 21

Round 22

Round 23

Round 24

Round 25

Round 26

Finals series

Qualifying finals

Semi finals

Preliminary finals

Grand final

Results
NRL Under-20s season